Vyacheslav Grigoryevich Dobrynin (born Antonov/Анто́нов on January 25, 1946, Ryazanskaya oblast, Russia) is a popular Russian composer and singer also known as Doctor Shlyager. He was awarded the People's Artist of Russia in 1996.'

Dobrynin was born in 1946 to an Armenian father and a Russian mother. He never bore his father's surname of Petrosian – his father left the family before he was born and he used his mother's surname Antonov throughout his childhood, changing it to Dobrynin in 1972. He studied at Moscow State University and received a diploma as an "art historian and theorist" in 1970. He subsequently worked at the Tretyakov Gallery and Pushkin Museum.  As an amateur musician and singer he participated in different Beatles-style groups. Dobrynin started to compose songs in the late-1960s and from 1971 co-operated with the Oleg Lundstrem orchestra, "Vesyolye Rebyata", "Samotsvety" and other bands. He has written more than 1000 songs, often based on poems by Leonid Derbenyov, Robert Rozhdestvensky, Mikhail Tanich and Ilya Reznik. In 1998, Dobrynin got a star on the Star Square in Moscow.

In the 1980s Dobrynin started to record his own songs, and in 1990 he founded "Doctor Shlyager" band.

Dobrynin's songs are mostly dedicated to unhappy love and romantic events of a person's life. Among his most popular hits are: 
 Vsyo, chto v zhizni yest u menya
 Rodnaya zemlya 
 Ne syp mne sol na ranu 
 Gde je ty byla 
 Kachaetsya vagon 
 Siniy tuman 
 Dve svechi 
 Belaya cheryomukha 
 Na teplohode muzika igraet 
 Luitza muzica 
 Ne volnuites tetia 
 Kapitan Zapasa 
 Yagoda Malina 
 Babushki-starushki 
 Koldovskoe ozero 
 Cazino 
 Ti mne ne snishsia 
 Tak Vot Kakaya Ti 
 Ti razbila moe serdce 
 Kto Tebe Skazal 
 Ya bous tvoey lubvi 
 Ni minuty pokoya 
 Ne zabivaite druzei 
 Napishi mne pismo 
 Pikovaya dama 
 Ya toskuyu po tebe 
 Ya svoe otgulyal 
 Nikto tebya ne lyubit tak kak ya 
 Sumashedshiy dozd 
 Do Chego Ya Nevezuchiy 
 Nezhnaya 
 Nezabudka 
 Proshay

Awards
Lenin Komsomol Prize,
15-times winner of Song of the Year Russia,
 Ovation prize (1991, "best composer" nomination).
 Order of Merit for the Fatherland IV degree (January 30, 2006)'

References

External links 
 
 Vyacheslav Dobrynin at iTunes
  

Soviet composers
Soviet male composers
Armenian composers
Russian composers
Russian male composers
Russian people of Armenian descent
People's Artists of Russia
1946 births
Living people
Soviet male singer-songwriters
Russian male singer-songwriters
Recipients of the Lenin Komsomol Prize
Russian pop musicians
Moscow State University alumni
20th-century Russian male singers
20th-century Russian singers
Winners of the Golden Gramophone Award